Henry William "Harry" Robshaw (10 May 1927 – 1990) was an English professional footballer who played for Tottenham Hotspur, Reading and Tonbridge.

Playing career
Robshaw joined Tottenham Hotspur in November 1948 as a junior. The wing half played one senior match  for the "Lilies" in a fixture against Liverpool on 1 December 1951. He signed for Reading in February 1953 and scored once in 20 matches. Robshaw went on to have a spell at Tonbridge.

References

External links
Spurs 1949-50 team photo

1927 births
1990 deaths
People from Edmonton, London
English footballers
Association football wing halves
Tottenham Hotspur F.C. players
Reading F.C. players
Tonbridge Angels F.C. players
English Football League players